Amintiri din copilărie (English: Childhood Memories) is the debut studio album of Moldovan popular singer Pavel Stratan.VODOOO It also sold very well in Romania.

Track listing

References

2002 debut albums
Pavel Stratan albums